The Tyson Family Commercial Building is a historic commercial building at 151 Adams Street SE in Camden, Arkansas.  Built  1923, this vernacular  story brick commercial block is one of the few to survive in the city from this time.  Its main facade consists of three brick pilasters separated by plate glass windows supported by a metal frame.  These are topped by a series of smaller transom windows.  The two sections of the front are unequal in size, and one is slightly angled from the other.  Although a number of similar buildings were built in the 1920s, most were destroyed by fire in the 1960s.  It has always housed a general store.

The building was listed on the National Register of Historic Places in 1994.

See also
National Register of Historic Places listings in Ouachita County, Arkansas

References

Commercial buildings on the National Register of Historic Places in Arkansas
Late 19th and Early 20th Century American Movements architecture
Buildings and structures in Camden, Arkansas
National Register of Historic Places in Ouachita County, Arkansas
Commercial buildings completed in 1923
1923 establishments in Arkansas